Estádio ADC Parahyba is a multi-use stadium located in São José dos Campos, Brazil. It is used mostly for football matches and hosts the home matches of Clube Atlético Joseense and Futebol Clube Primeira Camisa. The stadium has a maximum capacity of 2,500 people.

References

External links
Templos do Futebol

ADC Parahyba
São José dos Campos
Football venues in São Paulo (state)